Kristine Robyn Bartlett  is an aged care worker from Lower Hutt, New Zealand. 

In 2012, Bartlett lodged an application with the Employment Relations Authority that she was not receiving equal pay as per the Equal Pay Act of 1972. She argued she had worked for 20 years for very low pay because aged care work is largely performed by women. Over the next five years, Bartlett's case, Terranova Homes & Care Limited v Service and Food Workers Union Nga Ringa Tota Incorporated, was heard by New Zealand's Employment Court, Court of Appeal and Supreme Court. In 2017, a settlement was reached which raised wages for workers in residential aged care, disability support services and home support services. 

In 2017, Bartlett won the NEXT Woman of the Year Supreme Award. The panel of judges stated that Bartlett had taken responsibility for the pay equity fight and had improved the lives of many thousands of women.

In the 2018 Queen's Birthday Honours, Bartlett was appointed a Companion of the New Zealand Order of Merit, for services to equal pay advocacy.

References

Living people
Year of birth missing (living people)
People from Lower Hutt
New Zealand people in health professions
20th-century New Zealand women
21st-century New Zealand women
Companions of the New Zealand Order of Merit
New Zealand activists